Kazimierz Krukowski (born 2 February 1901 in Łódź — died 24 December 1984 in Warsaw), professionally known as Lopek, was a Polish cabaret performer and writer, revue and film actor.

Career
He performed songs and monologues by famous poets and songwriters including Marian Hemar, Jerzy Jurandot, Antoni Słonimski, Julian Tuwim and Andrzej Włast. He made his first movie in 1927 (Ziemia obiecana) as part of a comedy duo, "Lopek and Florek," with Adolf Dymsza; they made several more movies together including Janko Muzykant; Ułani, ułani, chłopcy malowani, and Co mój mąż robi w nocy? (What does my husband do at night?) In 1935 he starred in the film ABC miłości. He was engaged at the cabaret Qui Pro Quo by his cousin Julian Tuwim. He performed in theaters, kleynkunst, and cabarets including Morskie Oko, Banda, Cyganeria, Cyrulik Warszawski, Wielka Rewia, and in 1939 he founded his own theater, the Ali Baba.

"in the cabarets, a new genre of entertainment—the Jewish joke, monologue or sketch known as szmonces—rose to prominence. The szmonces, inevitably characterized by a more or less subtle żydłaczenie, at its best turned the pretentious Jewish assimilator or the harried Jewish tradesman into universally accessible symbols of the dislocations of modern life; at its worst, it became vulgar antisemitic caricature. The performer Kazimierz Krukowski (1902–1984), known as Lopek, was among those acclaimed as a specialist in the genre."

During the Second World War he appeared in one of the cabarets in the Warsaw ghetto. He fought in the Soviet Union and subsequently lived in Britain, the United States, and Argentina, where he ran the El Nacional theater.

Books
He wrote several books: Mała antologia kabaretu (Small cabaret anthology), Z Melpomeną na emigracji (With Melpomene in exile) and Moja Warszawka (My Warsaw).

External links
 
  by Szymon Kataszek and Henryk Gold
 
  Character Lopek gets in trouble in the big city

References

1901 births
1984 deaths
Actors from Łódź
Jewish cabaret performers
People from Piotrków Governorate
Polish male film actors
Polish male silent film actors
Polish cabaret performers
Entertainers from Łódź
Jewish Polish male actors
Knights of the Order of Polonia Restituta
Warsaw Ghetto inmates
Holocaust survivors
20th-century Polish male actors
20th-century Polish  male singers
20th-century comedians
Recipient of the Meritorious Activist of Culture badge